Doodlin' may refer to:

"Doodlin'" (Horace Silver song), a composition by Horace Silver
Doodlin' (album), a recording by saxophonist Archie Shepp